Media Defence (registered company name: Media Legal Defense Initiative) is a non-governmental organization established in 2008 to provide legal assistance to journalists, citizen journalists and independent media institutions. It also supports training in media law and promotes the exchange of information, litigation tools and strategies for the lawyers working on media freedom cases.

It is based in London and has a global network of media lawyers and media freedom activists with whom it works on cases and projects.

History 
The idea for the Media Defence originated in the aftermath of the criminal defamation trial in 2004 of Indonesian newspaperman Bambang Harymurti, editor of Tempo magazine (Indonesia). A group of people involved in assisting the defence of Harymurti recognised the need for an independent non-governmental organisations that would focus on providing legal support to journalists and media outlets around the world who need assistance to defend their legal rights, as well as work to improve the capacity of lawyers in Southeast Asia and elsewhere to defend media freedom of expression.

Media Defence was established as a not-for-profit company in June 2008 and registered as an independent charitable organisation in 2009. Gugulethu Moyo was executive director of Media Defence from June 2009 until July 2011. Peter Noorlander became Chief Executive between April 2011 and April 2016 while Lucy Freeman succeeded him as Chief Executive between 2016 and 2021. The organization's substantive (current) CEO is Alinda Vermeer, who joined in 2014.

Since its foundation, Media Defense has provided assistance in the form of grants to individuals for legal fees, supporting nongovernmental organizations providing legal services to the media, and free legal advice in cases in Africa, Europe, Asia, and North and South America respectively. Grants have also been given to enable the training and networking of media lawyers in Thailand, Malaysia, Singapore, Indonesia, Cambodia, and the Philippines.

Notable cases supported 
Media Defence has supported the legal defence of numerous journalists, citizen journalists and independent media organisations, including:
 Burundi Journalists' Union v. Burundi, at the East African Court of Justice. Media Defence represented the Journalists Union with Don Deya arguing the matter before the EACJ;
 Lohé Issa Konaté v. Burkina Faso, the first free speech case before the African Court of Human and Peoples' Rights which ruled that the imprisonment for defamation of a journalist from Burkina Faso violated his rights and ordered the country to change its laws. Media Defence's Legal Director, Nani Jansen, represented Lohé Issa Konaté v. Burkina Faso before the Court alongside John Jones QC and Steven Finizio;
 Media Defence contributed to the defence costs of Al Jazeera journalist Mohamed Fahmy, on trial in Egypt on charges of being part of a terrorist group, broadcasting “false news, and operating without adequate licences”;
 The appeal to the European Court of Human Rights of Emin Milli and Adnan Hajizade, two Azeri bloggers who uploaded a satirical video featuring an interview with a violin-playing donkey onto YouTube. In response they were beaten up - and then arrested and imprisoned for affray;
 The defence of Thai webmaster Chiranuch Premchaiporn in her criminal case for allowing comments that were critical of the Thai monarchy to appear on news and current affairs website, Prachatai;
 The defence of Nigerian corruption and human rights website Sahara Reporters in several multimillion-dollar libel suits launched against it in the United States;
 The defence of Ugandan journalist Patrick Otim, wrongly accused of treason and imprisoned for two years;
 The defence of Kenyan journalist Bernard Okebe, false accused of attempting to bribe the police following a story on police corruption;
 The defence of Thai newspaper columnist Kamol Kamoltrakul in a multimillion-dollar defamation case brought against him in 2008 by Tesco Lotus, the Southeast Asian subsidiary of Tesco, the world's second largest supermarket chain. Mr Kamoltrakol had criticised Tesco Lotus for driving homegrown small businesses out of existence. After much pressure Tesco eventually dropped the case;
 Raynor v. Richardson, which overturned Bermuda's criminal libel statute;
 Wattan TV's appeal to the Israeli High Court for compensation and damages, following an illegal army raid on their offices;
 A case brought against Ugandan police brought by two journalists who were beaten up when they tried to film a story critical of the police;
 The defence in 2009 and subsequent appeal to the UN Human Rights Committee of the libel case of Almas Kusherbaev, a Kazakh journalist who criticised the involvement of a Kazakh politician, Romin Madinov, in the trade of grain which has pushed up the price of bread in the country;
 The defence of Rwandan journalists Agnes Uwimana and Saidat Mukakibibi, for which it send a legal team consisting of Media Defence's Legal Counsel Nani Jansen and barrister John Jones to conduct the defence of the case alongside Rwandan counsel. Initially convicted on multiple counts of genocide denial and endangering national security and sentenced to seventeen and seven years, a Media Defence-supported Supreme Court appeal saw the two acquitted on all charges save defamation of the president and one count of endangering national security and the sentences reduced. The case is currently pending before the African Commission on Human and Peoples' Rights.
Submitting cases of prominent Vietnamese citizen journalists and rights activists including Le Dinh Luong, Nguyen Van Dai and Nguyen Dang Minh Man to the United Nations Working Group on Arbitrary Detention.
Representing the plaintiffs of the 2017 Togo Internet shutdown case alongside Amnesty International. The ECOWAS Court ruled that Togo, by shutting down the Internet in 2017, violated the rights of the plaintiffs – seven Togolese NGOs and a journalist.
Representing award-winning journalist Khadija Ismayilova alongside Yalchin Imanov and international law firms Wilmer Hale and De Brauw Blackstone Westbroek in a 2013 privacy case. The ECtHR found violations of Articles 8 and 10 of the European Convention on Human Rights by Azerbaijan as a result of intrusions into Ismayilova's private life.
Intervening in the case of Szurovecz v Hungary, where the European Court of Human Rights held that a refusal to grant a journalist access to an asylum seeker reception centre in Hungary violated his right to freedom of expression.
Supporting the case of Mseto in Tanzania after a ministerial order against Mseto attempted to ban it from publishing for three years.
Work in the case of Federation of African Journalists (FAJ) and others v. The Gambia, where the ECOWAS Court found that the rights of four Gambian journalists had been violated by the actions of the Gambian authorities, and through the enforcement of laws criminalising speech.
Submitting an amicus brief alongside PEN International, PEN America, PEN Mexico, PEN Quebec, Media Law Resource Center, Fundación para la Libertad de Prensa (FLIP), and Human Rights Watch in the case of Tulio Álvarez v Venezuela.

Media Defence has been invited to intervene as amicus curiae in the European Court of Human Rights in the cases of Von Hannover v. Germany (2) (application no. 40660/08), adjudicated in February, 2012, on the balance between privacy and freedom of expression, MGN Trinity Mirror v. UK, in which it argued that the high cost of defending libel cases violates the right to freedom of expression, and Pauliukas v. Lithuania in 2009. The European Court issued a strong ruling agreeing with Media Defence's submissions in the MGN case. Along with others, Media Defence also intervened in Max Mosley's application to the European Court of Human Rights, as to whether there should be advance notice given to targets in privacy cases, and Sanoma v Netherlands a case addressing the protection of journalistic sources. In both cases, its arguments were accepted by the Court. It has interventions pending in a case challenging so-called "false news" laws, prohibiting the publication of anything the authorities deem to be incorrect; and in a case concerning the abuse of criminal libel laws.

Media Defence has also been at the forefront of a campaign at the Council of Europe to address the impact that counter-terrorism laws are having on media freedom. The council's campaign has resulted in a pledge by States to review these laws.

With the IBA and others, Media Defence also supports the development of the media lawyers network in Southeast Asia.

Organization and funding 
Media Defence is registered as a charity Organization in the United Kingdom.

Award 
In March 2015 the Media Defence was awarded Columbia University's inaugural Global Freedom of Expression Prize.

References

External links 
 

International journalism organizations
Freedom of expression organizations
Organizations established in 2008
Charities based in London